Henry H. Vincent (January 10, 1867 – August 6, 1935) was an American college football player and coach. He served as the co-head football coach at Lafayette College in Easton, Pennsylvania during the 1893 and 1894 seasons, compiling a record of 8–12. Vincent played college football at Princeton University in Princeton, New Jersey in 1892. His first foray into coaching occurred midway through the 1893 season when he gave pointers to the 1893 while visiting his brother in Pennsylvania.

A native of Danville, Pennsylvania, Vincent graduated from New York Law School in 1894. He was admitted to the bar in New York, but never practice law, instead working in the lumber business. Vincent died on August 6, 1935, at Geisinger Memorial Hospital in Danville.

Head coaching record

References

1867 births
1935 deaths
19th-century players of American football
American football ends
Businesspeople in timber
Lafayette Leopards football coaches
Princeton Tigers football players
New York Law School alumni
People from Danville, Pennsylvania
Coaches of American football from Pennsylvania
Players of American football from Pennsylvania